"Thoughts" is the seventeenth single by Japanese rock band Luna Sea, released on August 28, 2013. It reached number 7 on the Oricon chart and number 14 on Billboards Japan Hot 100.

Overview
The B-side "Lost World" is one of the few Luna Sea songs originally composed by Ryuichi. Inoran said that Sugizo helped arrange it and thus added his own "essence" into it.

The single was released in three editions; a regular CD single, and two limited editions both with the music video for "Thoughts", but one version with it on Blu-ray, the other on DVD. All three have different cover art.

"Thoughts" was used in a commercial for the mobile game Master of Chaos, while "Lost World" was used in one for the game Space Fighter.

Track listing
All songs written and composed by Luna Sea.
"Thoughts" - 4:04Originally composed by Inoran.
"Lost World" - 5:45Originally composed by Ryuichi.

References

External links 
Master of Chaos website

Luna Sea songs
2013 singles
2013 songs
Universal Music Group singles